Sofiane Bayazid (born November 16, 1996 in Nezla) is an Algerian footballer who plays for USM Khenchela in the Algerian Ligue Professionnelle 1.

On November 2, 2022, Bayazid made his Algeria A' national football team debut in a friendly match against Niger, setting up the 2nd goal in a 2-0 win.

References

External links
 

1996 births
Algeria A' international footballers
Algerian Ligue Professionnelle 1 players
Algerian footballers
USM Khenchela players
Living people
People from Touggourt Province
2022 African Nations Championship players